(Stanley) Keith Runcorn  (19 November 1922 – 5 December 1995) was a British physicist whose paleomagnetic reconstruction of the relative motions of Europe and America revived the theory of continental drift and was a major contribution to plate tectonics.

Education and early life
Runcorn was born in Southport, Lancashire, and educated at King George V Grammar School and Gonville and Caius College, Cambridge, whence he graduated in engineering within two years in 1942. After a period in radar research during the World War II, he joined the Physics Department at the University of Manchester where he did research on aspects of the Earth's magnetic field, taking his PhD for research supervised by Patrick Blackett in 1949.

Career and research
Runcorn's PhD led to his interest in palaeomagnetism, the study of the magnetism of rocks, which he pursued first at the Geophysics Department at the University of Cambridge and later at Newcastle University, where he was appointed to the chair of Physics in 1956. At Newcastle, Runcorn developed a strong research group in geophysics, and made substantial contributions to various fields, including convection in the Earth and Moon, the shape and magnetic fields of the Moon and planets, magnetohydrodynamics of the Earth's core, changes in the length of the day, polar wandering, continental drift and plate tectonics. After his retirement in 1988 he continued to be active in various lines of research until his untimely death in San Diego in 1995.

Awards and honours
Runcorn received many honours, including Fellowship of the Royal Society in 1965, the Gold Medal of the Royal Astronomical Society (RAS) and the Fleming medal of the American Geophysical Union (AGU). He was also a member of the Pontifical Academy of Science. In 1970 he was awarded the Vetlesen Prize, widely considered the highest honor in geology. In 1981, Runcorn became a founding member of the World Cultural Council. He served as the Sydney Chapman Endowed Chair in Physical Sciences at the University of Alaska from 1989 to 1995.  In 2007 the RAS named an award – for the year's best PhD thesis in geophysics – the Keith Runcorn Prize in his honour.

Refereed journal publications

Popularizations

Edited books

 
Continental drift (1962), S.K. Runcorn.
 
International dictionary of geophysics : seismology, geomagnetism, aeronomy, oceanography, geodesy, gravity, marine geophysics, meteorology, the earth as a planet and its evolution (1967), ed.
 
Methods in palaeomagnetism: Proceedings of the NATO Advanced Study Institute on Palaeomagnetic Methods (1967), edited by D.W. Collinson, K.M. Creer, S.K. Runcorn

Earth Sciences (1971), S.K. Runcorn
Implications of continental drift to the earth sciences (1973) NATO Advanced Study Institute, D.H. Tarling and S.K. Runcorn
Mechanisms of continental drift and plate tectonics (1980) edited by P. A. Davies and S. K. Runcorn
Magnetism, planetary rotation, and convection in the solar system : retrospect and prospect : in honour of Prof. S.K. Runcorn (1985) edited by W. O'Reilly, S. K. Runcorn

Death
Runcorn was murdered in his hotel room in San Diego during a lecture trip to the Scripps Institution of Oceanography.  Police found that he had been strangled and found evidence of injuries to the head. Paul Cain, a professional kick-boxer, was later convicted and sentenced to a term of at least 25 years. Prosecutors argued that Cain killed Runcorn after stealing his wallet and credit cards, having targeted him as an elderly gay man and therefore easy victim.  Cain was tried three times in all.  The first trial ended with a deadlocked jury; the second with a conviction that was overturned on appeal, on grounds that testimony from Cain's two previous wives as to his violent temper should not have been admitted in evidence.

References

Further reading

1922 births
1995 deaths
People from Southport
20th-century British geologists
British geophysicists
Recipients of the Gold Medal of the Royal Astronomical Society
Alumni of Gonville and Caius College, Cambridge
Fellows of the Royal Society
Academics of Newcastle University
Founding members of the World Cultural Council
Tectonicists
British expatriates in the United States